This is a list of Troy Trojans football players in the NFL Draft.

Key

Selections

References

Troy

Troy Trojans NFL Draft